Obiageri Pamela Amaechi (born March 12, 1999) is a Nigerian discus thrower who came third in the discus events at the 2022 Commonwealth Games and the 2022 African Championships in Athletics. She has competed for the Princeton Tigers in US college athletics.

Personal life
Amaechi is from San Francisco, US.

Career
In 2018, she won the ECAC/IC4A Outdoor Championship discus event, competing for Princeton Tigers. As of 2022, she is the Ivy League record holder in discus, and had received All-America honors twice. She competed for the US at the 2018 IAAF World U20 Championships, where she finished 14th in the qualifying round, and did not qualify for the final.

Amaechi made her debut for Nigeria at the 2022 African Championships in Athletics, finishing third in the discus event. Later that month, she won the Nigerian National Championships event, which was also a qualifier for the 2022 Commonwealth Games. She came third in the discus event at the Commonwealth Games. Later in the year, she came third at a Nigerian Sports Festival.

References

External links
 

1999 births
Living people
Track and field athletes from San Francisco
Nigerian female discus throwers
Commonwealth Games bronze medallists for Nigeria
Commonwealth Games medallists in athletics
American expatriate sportspeople in Nigeria
21st-century Nigerian women
Princeton Tigers women's track and field athletes
Athletes (track and field) at the 2022 Commonwealth Games
Medallists at the 2022 Commonwealth Games